Larry E. Haines (born April 11, 1938) is a Republican former member of the Maryland Senate from 1991 to 2011.

Background
Larry Haines was elected to the Maryland Senate in 1991 to represent district 5, which covers Carroll and Baltimore counties. Haines graduated from Mt. Airy High School and attended Frederick Community College.

Career
Haines has been a real estate broker and an appraiser and is a former dairy farmer. He was a member of the Maryland Association of Realtors (legislative committee, 1986–1990), chair of the Legislative Committee, Carroll County Association of Realtors, from 1986 to 1990, a member of the American Association of Certified Appraisers, and a director of the Bank of Maryland Carroll County.

He received the Realtor of the Year award by the Carroll County Association of Realtors in 1975.

Haines was a member of the Housing Study Committee for the city of Westminster from 1974 to 1980, and a member of the Board of Zoning Appeals for the city of Westminster from 1983 to 1989.

Election results
2006 race for Maryland State Senate – District 5
{| class="wikitable"
|-
!Name
!Votes
!Percent
!Outcome
|-
|-
|Larry E. Haines, Rep.
|23,870
|  97.9%
|   Won
|-
|Other Write-Ins
|618
|  2.1%
|   Lost
|}

2002 race for Maryland State Senate – District 5
{| class="wikitable"
|-
!Name
!Votes
!Percent
!Outcome
|-
|-
|Larry E. Haines, Rep.
|35,749
|  74.2%
|   Won
|-
|-
|Ronald Zepp, Dem.
|12,399
|  25.7%
|   Lost
|-
|Other Write-Ins
|49
|  0.1%
|   Lost
|}

1998 race for Maryland State Senate – District 5
{| class="wikitable"
|-
!Name
!Votes
!Percent
!Outcome
|-
|-
|Larry E. Haines, Rep.
|29,341
|  100%
|   Won
|}

1994 race for Maryland State Senate – District 5
{| class="wikitable"
|-
!Name
!Votes
!Percent
!Outcome
|-
|-
|Larry E. Haines, Rep.
|22,599
|  64%
|   Won
|-
|-
|Cynthia Huggins Cummings, Dem.
|12,857
|  36%
|   Lost
|}

1990 race for Maryland State Senate – District 5
{| class="wikitable"
|-
!Name
!Votes
!Percent
!Outcome
|-
|-
|Larry E. Haines, Rep.
|16,400
|  53%
|   Won
|-
|-
|J. Jeffrey Griffith, Dem.
|14,373
|  47%
|   Lost
|}

References

Republican Party Maryland state senators
1938 births
People from Woodbine, Maryland
People from Carroll County, Maryland
Living people
21st-century American politicians